Totoa Nunatak is a nunatak at the southwest end of the Moremore Nunataks,  west of Mount Bastion, on the plateau of the Willett Range of Victoria Land.  Totoa is a Māori wind word, meaning "boisterous and stormy", and was applied descriptively to this nunatak in 2005 by the New Zealand Geographic Board.

References

Totoa
Totoa